Dmitri Aleksandrovich Pavlov is a Russian composer. He was born in St Petersburg in 1959, and graduated from St. Petersburg Conservatoire in 1982 class Theory and Composition. Acclaimed for his work as a film composer and perhaps best known for his score for the film The Cuckoo (Кукушка in Russian) directed by Aleksandr Rogozhkin.

Apart from music for film, Dmitri Pavlov has written for ballet, theatre and orchestra. He formed Pavlov Ballet in 1992, and also arranged for the 'Spirit of Mozart' concert in Vienna, commemorating  250th anniversary of Mozart's birth. One of his works is Concerto for piano, computer and orchestra, which breaks boundaries and successfully merges sampled computer generated sounds with classical.

He used the computer generated sounds in recording of another work The Fall of Babylon, biblical Allegory for Choir and Orchestra based on Old and New Testament Texts. ( This was recorded at St.Petersburg Radio and Television Studio, St.Petersburg Conservatoire Choir, St.Petersburg Philharmonic Orchestra, conductor Alexander Titov, solo violin-Alexander Shustin, recorder-Alexander Kiskachy, solo cello-Sergey Pechatin, electronics-Dmitri Pavlov, sound engineer-Vladimir Lukichev.)

Pavlov is married and has two children. He currently resides in Berlin.

Film music
Dmitri Pavlov written music for the following films:
1988 "Bells of the North", director - M Micheev
1988 "Requiem",director - K Artjuchov
1988 "Return", director - A Golovin
1989 "Alexander Nevsky", director - A Golovin
1989 "The Lost Soul", director - M Micheev
1990 "The Paternal House" The House of F Dostoievsky, director - M Micheev
1992 "Kolyma", director - M Micheev
1992 "Maximilian Voloshin" director - A Rjabokon
1993 "Tchekist", director A.Rogozhkin
1994 "Boule de Suif" film-ballet, produced by "Telefilm", director - Alexander Tikhonov
1994 "Cameo Gonzaga", 1994, director - L Volkov
1994 "Physiology of Russian Life " / Great Russian physiologist Ivan Pavlov, director - I Alimpiev
2002 "The Cuckoo", director A Rogozhkin
2003 "Sapiens"(short film),director A Rogozhkin
2004 "The one's strange life", music for a film serial, director A Rogozhkin
2006 "Peregon" director A Rogozhkin
2008 "Igra" (ORT), director A Rogozhkin

Awards 
Pavlov has won many awards for his compositions, including the 2004 State Prize from the Russian Federation.

See also
The Cuckoo (film)

References

External links 
 Dmitri Pavlov website
 The New York Times Movies

Russian composers
Russian male composers
Living people
1959 births
Musicians from Saint Petersburg